Herman Kiefer Hospital was a city-owned hospital in Detroit Michigan, from 1911 to 2013. It was founded to serve as a public health hospital; to combat rampant infectious diseases, such as tuberculosis, diphtheria, scarlet fever, mumps, measles, and other diseases. It was named after Herman Kiefer, a prominent local physician known for treating the poor.

History
The first public health facility on the site was opened in 1886 as a smallpox hospital on the outskirts of the city. In 1892 it burned down in a fire deemed "suspicious.". Over the next twenty years several "tent" hospitals were constructed on the site, each dedicated to treating a specific infectious disease—scarlet fever, diphtheria and tuberculosis. In 1909, six more tents were added, causing plans to begin to build a permanent structure.

The first permanent structures, pavilions, designed by architect George Mason, opened in 1911. By the mid 1920s  Detroit voters approved a $3-million bond issue, to build a brick and cement hospital. This building, designed by Albert Kahn in Neo-Romanesque Revival style, was 424,000 square feet, and had 500 beds in single, or double, rooms, instead of the, then standard, 10 bed wards. This new building opened in December 1928. By 1932 it had 1,200 beds.

Hospital
The hospital was the primary health care facility of the City of Detroit from its founding to closure. During its 75 years it treated the poorest citizens of the city. For the first 35 years most patients had infectious diseases. In 1953 a 250-bed addition was added to treat tuberculosis. By the end of the sixties, the era of infectious diseases was over due to antibiotics. In 1928 there were 1,756 deaths from infectious diseases, in 1969 there were under 100. During 1970s, the patient population changed to the very old, the indigent, and those who had social problems.

In 1951, the Rehabilitation Institute of Metropolitan Detroit was founded at Herman Kiefer Hospital. The Kiefer Hospital was the main treatment facility for polio in Detroit, which was rampant at that time. Polio patients are often paralyzed, and the Kiefer naturally provided their polio patients with rehabilitation. It was also the site of the Metropolitan Detroit Polio Foundation, which merged with the Rehabilitation Institute in 1953. These two partners soon realized they needed a building of their own to house all their services. As a result, in 1958, the Rehabilitation Institute moved to a newly built hospital at the Detroit Medical Center.

Closure
By the early 21st century the Kiefer was acting almost entirely as a public health facility, dispensing free vaccinations. With the City of Detroit was facing bankruptcy, the mayor, David Bing, decided that the one million dollar maintenance cost of the aging building could not be afforded. Bing closed the hospital, transferring its public health services to a private nonprofit which operated throughout the city from neighborhood facilities. Under Mayor Mike Duggan The Detroit Health Department was reformed under the leadership of Dr. Abdul El-Sayed and now operates essential local public health services.

Redevelopment
In June 2015, plans were announced for the redevelopment of the building, and other buildings in the complex, into a mixed use residential, business, and commercial center.

See also 
 Herman Kiefer

References

External links
 Redevelopment of massive empty Herman-Kiefer building in Detroit in the works—MLive, June 18, 2015

Hospital buildings completed in 1928
Hospitals in Detroit
1928 establishments in Michigan
Defunct hospitals in Michigan
Hospitals disestablished in 2013